Joseph Charles Tilson  (born 24 August 1928) is a British artist and fellow of the Royal Academy. He was involved in the Pop Art movement in the 1960s; he has made paintings, prints and constructions.

Early life and education 

Tilson was born in London on 24 August 1928. He was in the Royal Air Force from 1946 to 1949. He studied at Saint Martin's School of Art from 1949 until 1952, and then at the Royal College of Art until 1955. In that year he received a Rome Prize, and went to Italy for two years. He returned to London in 1957, and from 1958 to 1963 he taught at Saint Martin's, and subsequently taught at the Slade School of Fine Art, University College London, The School of Visual Arts, New York and the Hochschule fur Bildende Kunste, Hamburg. In 1961 he exhibited at the Paris Biennale.

Career 
During the 1960s Tilson became one of the leading figures associated with the British Pop Art movement. Making use of his previous experience as a carpenter and joiner, Tilson produced wooden reliefs and constructions as well as prints and paintings. As a student at the RCA Tilson associated with Frank Auerbach, Leon Kossoff, R. B. Kitaj, Peter Blake, Allen Jones, Patrick Caulfield and David Hockney.

His first one-man show was held at the Marlborough Gallery, London in 1962. In 1977 he joined the Waddington Galleries and also exhibited at the Alan Cristea Gallery and the Giò Marconi Galleries in Milan. Tilson's work gained an international reputation when shown at the XXXII Venice Biennale in 1964, which led to a retrospective at the Boyman's Museum, Rotterdam in 1964. Further retrospective exhibitions followed at the Vancouver Art Gallery in 1979 and the Arnolfini Gallery, Bristol in 1984.

Growing disillusionment with the consumer society led to a change in Tilson work in the 1970s. After moving to Wiltshire in 1972, Tilson began to use a wider variety of materials, including stone, straw and rope in an effort to transcend time and culture by drawing on the motifs of pre-Classical mythology. This body of work was called Alchera.

Tilson's work has been exhibited regularly in solo shows throughout the world: Cortona Centro Culturale Fontanella Borghese, Rome (1990), Plymouth City Museum (1991), Palazzo Pubblico, Siena (1995), Mestna Gallery, Ljubljana (1996) and Galleria Comunale d'Arte, Cesena (2000). Recently a major retrospective was held at the Royal Academy of Arts, London (2002). Among Tilson's awards are the Gulbenkian Foundation Prize (1960) and the Grand Prix d'Honneur, Biennale of Ljubljana (1996). He is a Royal Academician and his career was celebrated with a retrospective exhibition in 2002 at the Royal Academy 'Joe Tilson: Pop to Present' (Sackler Galleries) from April 2002. He was also invited to paint the banner for the "Palio", Siena in 1996. In 2019, he was commissioned make an installation for the Swatch Pavilion at the Venice Biennial inspired by his 'Stones of Venice' works. He also designed a limited edition watch as part of the project.

He was elected an Associate of the Royal Academy (ARA) in 1985 and a full Royal Academician (RA) in 1991.

Personal life 
Tilson lives and works in London and Italy.

He was married in Venice in 1956 to Joslyn Morton (Jos) (b. 1934, Edinburgh), and has three children: Jake (b. 1958, London), Anna (b. 1959, London), and Sophy (b. 1965, London).

Exhibitions 
Tilson's solo exhibitions include:

 Marlborough Fine Art, London. Joe Tilson at 90
 Alan Cristea Gallery, London. Joe Tilson at 90
 Academician's Room, Royal Academy of Arts, London. Joe Tilson RA
 2016 Marlborough Fine Art, London. Tilson: The Stones of Venice, Marlborough Fine Art, London
 2016 Alan Cristea Gallery, London. Tilson, Words and Images: The Notebooks
 2013 Marlborough Fine Art, London. Joe Tilson : A Survey
 2012–13 University of Ljubljana
 2012 Bugno Art Gallery, Venice
 2009 Alan Cristea Gallery, London
 2008 Bugno Art Gallery, Venice
 2007 Waddington Galleries, London
 2006 Palazzo Doria, Loano (retrospective)
 Menhir Arte Contemporanea, La Spezia
 2004 Beaux Arts Gallery, London
 2002 Royal Academy of Arts, London (retrospective)
 Alan Cristea Gallery, London (prints)
 Beaux Arts Gallery, London
 2001 Castelbasso, Abruzzo (retrospective) 
 Giò Marconi Gallery, Milan (retrospective)
 1999–2000 Palazzo Pubblico, Siena, touring to Galleria Comunale d'Arte, Cesena and Pinacoteca Civica, Follonica
 1999 Peter Guyther Gallery, London
 Theo Waddington, Boca Raton, Florida
 Castello Doria, Porto Venere
 1998 Theo Waddington Fine Art, London
 Marino alla Scala, Milan
 1997 Cankarjev Dom, Ljubljana (prints retrospective)
 1996 Annandale Galleries, Sydney
 Mestna Gallery, Ljubljana
 1995 Westend Galerie, Frankfurt
 Palazzo Pubblico, Siena
 Theo Waddington Fine Art, London
 Alan Cristea Gallery, London
 1994 Pinacoteca, Macerata
 Galleria Rotta, Genova
 1993 Multimedia, Brescia
 Gio Marconi, Milan
 Cooperativa Ceramica d'Imola
 Heter A Hunermann Galerie GmbH, Düsseldorf
 1992 Extra Moemia, Todi

 Waddington Graphics, London
 Waddington Galleries, London
 1991 Plymouth City Museum
 Tour Fromage, Aosta
 Galerie Inge Baecker, Cologne
 1990 Centro Culturale Fontanella Borghese, Rome
 Fortezza Medicea, Cortona
 1984 Arnolfini Gallery, Bristol (retrospective)
 1979 Vancouver Art Gallery (prints retrospective)
 1978 Tate Gallery, London (prints)
 1976 Marlborough Fine Art, Marlborough Graphics, London
 1971 Museum Boijmans van Beuningen, Rotterdam (retrospective) touring to Belgium and Italy
 Waddington Galleries, London
 1970 Marlborough New London Gallery, London
 1968 Galleria Ferrari, Verona
 Galleria de'Foscherari, Bologna
 Galerie Brusberg, Hanover
 1967 Galleria del Naviglio, Milan
 Marlborough Galleria d'Arte, Rome
 1966 Marlborough New London Gallery, London
 1965 Kunstamt Renickendorf, Berlin
 Stadt Museum, Recklinghausen
 Kunstverein, Braunschweig
 Stedelijk Museum, Amsterdam
 1964 Marlborough New London Gallery, London
 British Pavilion, XXXII Venice Biennale
 Modern Galerija, Zagreb
 1963 Hatton Gallery, Newcastle upon Tyne
 Ferens Art Gallery, Hull
 Walker Art Gallery, Liverpool
 University Art Gallery, Nottingham
 1962 Marlborough New London Gallery

Collections 
Tilson's art is held in public collections including the Tate Gallery, London; MoMA, New York and the Stedelijk, Amsterdam.

References

Further reading 
 Joe Tilson: Pages (exh. cat., London, Marlborough F.A., 1970) ASIN: B000KCXLN6
 Joe Tilson (exh. cat., Rotterdam, Mus. Boymans–van Beuningen, 1973) [with texts by the artist] A. C. Quintavalle: Tilson, preface P. Restany (Milan, 1977) ASIN: B005IV7UKO
 Tilson Alchera. Notes for Country Works, Marlborough Gallery (1976)ASIN: B00CE48WDM
 Gillo Dorfles: Maestri contemporanei: Tilson, (Milan, 1982)
 Maurizio Fagiolo dell'Arco: Opere recenti: Extra Moenia, (Todi, 1992) M. Compton and M. Livingstone: Tilson (London and Milan, 1993) 
 Enrico Crispolti: Terracotta e maiolica; sculture e rilievi, (Imola, 1995)
 Mel Gooding: Tilson: Pop to Present, (Royal Academy of Arts, London 2002)
 Enzo Di Martino: Tilson, The Printed Works – L'Opera Grafica 1963–2009, preface by Phillip Rylands and texts by Alan Cristea, Enzo Di Martino, Joe Tilson, Papiro Arte (2009) 
 Venice, 2009 (Royal Academy of Arts, London, 2010)
 Joe Tilson – a Survey, Marlborough Fine Art (London) Ltd (24 Feb 2013)

External links 
 Joe Tilson website – official
 
 Artcyclopedia
 British Council, Venice Biennale participation 1964

Living people
1928 births
20th-century English painters
English male painters
21st-century English painters
English sculptors
English male sculptors
English contemporary artists
British contemporary artists
Royal Academicians
20th-century English male artists
21st-century English male artists